Dunhill GAA is a Gaelic Athletic Association club based in Dunhill, County Waterford, Ireland. The club enters teams in both GAA codes each year, which includes two adult hurling teams and one adult Gaelic football team in the Waterford County Championships.

The club has won the County Senior Hurling Championship twice, defeating Ballyduff Upper in 1978 and Mount Sion 1979, and the Senior Football Championship once, when it defeated Tramore in 1975.

The club presently has no underage setup. Instead, a separate club called Dunhill/Fenor was created between Dunhill and other local club, Fenor. The underage clubs caters for all underage levels from under-12 to under-21.

Honours 
Waterford Senior Hurling Championships: 2
 1978, 1979
Waterford Senior Football Championships: 1
 1975
 Waterford Intermediate Hurling Championships: 3
 1966, 2011, 2021
 Waterford Intermediate Football Championships: 1
 1970
 Waterford Junior Hurling Championships: 4
 1932, 1952, 1965, 1973
 Waterford Junior Football Championships: 1
 1954
 Waterford Minor Football Championships: 1
 1944 (as Dunhill O'Brienn's)

External links 
 Official club website

Gaelic games clubs in County Waterford
Hurling clubs in County Waterford
Gaelic football clubs in County Waterford